A list of films produced by the Bollywood film industry based in Mumbai in 1958:

Highest-grossing films
The ten highest-grossing films at the Indian Box Office in 1958:

A-D

E-M

N-R

S-Z

References

External links
 Bollywood films of 1958 at the Internet Movie Database
 Indian Film Songs from the Year 1958 - A look back at 1958 with a special focus on Hindi film songs

1958
Bollywood
Films, Bollywood